Génolhac is a commune in the Gard department in southern France.

Geography

Climate

Génolhac has a hot-summer Mediterranean climate (Köppen climate classification Csa).

Population

See also
Communes of the Gard department

References

External links

The Regordane Way or St Gilles Trail, which passes through Génolhac.

Communes of Gard